Gentian Koçi (born 1979) is an Albanian film director and screenwriter. His 2017 film Daybreak was selected as the Albanian entry for the Best Foreign Language Film at the 90th Academy Awards.

Selected filmography
 Daybreak (2017)

References

External links

1979 births
Living people
Albanian film directors
Albanian screenwriters
People from Tirana